Debra Gonsher Vinik, is an American producer and writer of documentary films.

Biography 
Dr. Gonsher Vinik worked as a producer at Bravo Magazine and was head of production for both CBS/Fox Video and Scanline Video. She earned her Ph.D. in Theatre Criticism from the City University of New York and is currently a Professor and Coordinator of the Liberal Arts & Sciences Program at Bronx Community College at the City University of New York.

She is based in New York.

Work 
Dr. Gonsher Vinik has produced and written 21 documentaries, twelve of which have been nominated for Emmy awards and six of which have won the honors: And The Gates Opened (2007), The Eternal Light (2008), Yearning To Belong (2009), Divine Prescription: Stories of Faith, Health and Community (2013), Beauty of their Dreams (2017), Brightness of Noon, part II (2019). Her films have appeared at festivals worldwide. Her latest work is Attention Must Be Paid: Women Lost in the Opioid Crisis a 90-minute feature documentary has been shown at live conferences and streamed to thousands in 2022, prior to airing as an expanded 2-part series on ABC, entitled Listen to the Silence. 

Her films generally focus on sicial justice issues from a multi faith perspective and address such subjects as community and inclusion for persons with disabilities, hunger in America, intimate partner violence, healthcare, immigration and advocating for girls' education worldwide.

Vinik has written two books and one textbook:

 Gonsher, Debra A., and Joshua Halberstam. The Community College Guide: The Essential Reference from Application to Graduation. Dallas, TX: BenBella, 2009. Print.
 -----------------------. Career Speak: Articulation and Presentation. Dubuque, IA: Kendall/Hunt, 2005. Print.
 -----------------------. Embracing Judaism: Personal Narratives of Renewed Faith. Northvale, NJ: Jason Aronson, 1999. Print.

Films

References 

Year of birth missing (living people)
Living people
American documentary film producers
City University of New York alumni
City University of New York faculty
Bronx Community College faculty